Karimabad-e Gavkhaneh (also Romanized as Karīmābād-e Gāvkhāneh; also known as Karīmābād) is a village in Kavirat Rural District, Chatrud District, Kerman County, Kerman Province, Iran. At the 2006 census, its population was 42, in 9 families.

References 

Populated places in Kerman County